Robert Wrenn is the name of:

Robert Wrenn (1873–1925), tennis champion
Robert Wrenn (golfer) (born 1959), PGA Tour golfer

See also
Bob Wren, ice hockey player